Octavious Mangaliso Matika is a South African politician who has served as the Deputy Speaker of the Northern Cape Provincial Legislature since May 2019. He took office as an MPL in October 2018. He was previously the Executive Mayor of the Sol Plaatje Local Municipality. Matika is a member of the African National Congress (ANC).

References

External links
People's Assembly profile
Northern Cape Provincial Legislature profile

Living people
African National Congress politicians
Members of the Northern Cape Provincial Legislature
Year of birth missing (living people)